Thadeosaurus is an extinct genus of diapsid reptile belonging to the family Younginidae. Fossils have been found in the Lower Sakamena Formation (Sakamena Group) of the Morondava Basin, Madagascar in 1981, and date to the late Permian to the early Triassic period.

Description 

It also had long toes, especially on the hind legs, which would have given it a powerful stride, since the toes would still touch the ground while the foot was being raised. Combined with a strong breast bone to increase the strength in the forelimbs, this means that Thadeosaurus was probably a good runner.

Below is a cladogram from Reisz et al. (2011) showing the phylogenetic position of Thadeosaurus among other early diapsids:

References 

Prehistoric neodiapsids
Prehistoric reptile genera
Lopingian reptiles of Africa
Early Triassic reptiles of Africa
Changhsingian genus first appearances
Induan genus extinctions
Fossils of Madagascar
Permian Madagascar
Triassic Madagascar
Fossil taxa described in 1981